The Saint of the Impossible is a 2020 Swiss drama film written by Lani-Rain Feltham and Marc Raymond Wilkins, who is also the director in his directional debut. The film stars Magaly Solier, Marcelo Durand, Adriano Durand, Tara Thaller and Simon Käser.

Cast
 Magaly Solier as Raffaella
 Adriano Durand Castro as Paul Andino
 Marcelo Durand Castro as Tito Andino
 Tara Thaller as Kristin
  as Ewald Krieg
 Bethany Kay as Receptionist
 Qurrat Ann Kadwani as ICE Officer Statham
 Brian Dole as Jake
 Carla Carvalho as Immigrant
 Pascal Yen-Pfister as coltman
 Damian Muziani as Customer with Cap
 Alan Rowe Kelly as Street journalist
 Joseph Covino as Manager
 Ratnesh Dubey as Adarsh
 Juan Szilagyi as NYPD Officer
 Craig Thomas Rivela as Reporter #1
 Jocelyne O'Toole as Mother (as Jocelyne Otoole)
 Peter Williams as Ear Wax Man
 Chris Valenti as Police Detective
 Elizabeth Covarrubias as Lucha
 Alex Xenos as Prison Guard (credit only)
 Franky Tarantino as Cuban Restaurant Patron
 Ralph Bracco as Detective
 Jeffrey Paul as Man with red face
 Isabelle Boulton as Journalist #2 (as Isabelle Zufferey Boulton)
 John F. Sarno as Simon
 Philip O'Gorman as The Waiter
 Adam Keane as Restaurant Patron
 Vincent Chan as Mr. Liu
 Carlos Valentino as Latino Prison Officer
 Amanda Lea Mason as Soccer Mom
 Kaori Eda as Laundromat Attendant
 Sam Kearns as Restaurant Patron
 Maxmillian Robinson as Kissing Couple
 Michael Raymond Fox as ICE Officer
 John Palacio as John Cray
 Melanie Christine Leon-Soon as Daughter
 Lisa Grecco as Sad Woman
 Patrick Gallagher as Admirer 1
 Kiat-Sing Teo as Min
 Leonid Sukala as Tough Guy (as Leonik Sukala)
 Franky Tarantino as Hispanic Restaurant Patron
 Pam Kalski as Diner
 Merin Frazier as Diner Patron
 Lynn Farrell as Diner Patron
 Miss Sandra Mhlongo as Nomusa
 Michael Pierre-Louis as Prison Guard

Release
The film had its world premiere in October 2020 at the
43rd São Paulo International Film Festival.

References

External links

Swiss drama films
English-language Swiss films
2020s Spanish-language films
2020s English-language films
2020 drama films